Udo Dirkschneider (born 6 April 1952) is a German singer and songwriter who rose to fame with German heavy metal band Accept. After leaving the band in 1987, he formed U.D.O., with which he has also enjoyed commercial success.

Biography

Former Accept and current U.D.O. lead singer Udo Dirkschneider has a long career spawning almost five decades that helped to shape German heavy metal. His unique and raspy voice approach and, his taste for huge choruses made big part of Accept's appeal and made him the one of the most recognizable characters in the heavy metal history.

In November 2011, Dirkschneider's son Sven supported U.D.O. on a date in Germany  and became a permanent member of his father's band in February 2015. On the same year, the band was temporary renamed as "Dirkschneider" and embarked in a long tour called "Back To The Roots" where the band only performed Accept songs.

In 2021, Udo along with his former Accept bandmates, guitarist Stefan Kaufmann and bassist Peter Baltes released new music under the name of "Dirkschneider And The Old Gang" that also features former U.D.O guitarist Matthias Dieth, drummer Svein Dirkschneider and singer Manuela Bibert, with the video of the song "Where The Angels Fly" surpassing a million of views on YouTube.

On 22 April 2022, Udo released an album of cover versions, entitled 'My Way', to mark his 70th birthday.

Duets

On his long career, Dirkschneider shared his vocals with few artists, as in the cover of Steppenwolf's "Born to Be Wild" released in 1983 as B-side of "Break the Chain" single on Raven's All for One album. Dirkschneider is also famous for his duet with his longtime friend Doro Pesch on the song "Dancing with an Angel".  In 1999, Dirkschneider recorded the Helloween song "I Want Out" and a new version of Accept's "Head Over Heels" with HammerFall. And as guest on the song  music "Shtil" by the Russian heavy metal band Aria on their 2001's album Chimera.

In 2006, Dirkschneider sang the song "They Only Come Out at Night" with Mr. Lordi on Lordi album The Arockalypse, as well as performing it live on stage at same year Wacken Open Air.

In 2013, Dirkschneider performed a duet with Marko Hietala on Finnish band Lazy Bonez's debut album Vol.1. They sang a song called "First to Go – Last to Know".

Discography

Accept

Studio albums 
 Accept (1979)
 I'm a Rebel (1980)
 Breaker (1981)
 Restless and Wild (1982)
 Balls to the Wall (1983)
 Metal Heart (1985)
 Russian Roulette (1986)
 Objection Overruled (1993)
 Death Row (1994)
 Predator (1996)

Live albums 
 Staying a Life (Live recording from 1985, released 1990)
 All Areas – Worldwide (Live from 1994 and 1995, released 1997)

EPs 
 Kaizoku-Ban (Live EP, 1985)
 Rich & Famous (EP, 2002)

U.D.O.

Studio albums 

 Animal House (1987)
 Mean Machine (1989)
 Faceless World (1990)
 Timebomb (1991)
 Solid (1997)
 No Limits (1998)
 Holy (1999)
 Man and Machine (2002)
 Thunderball (2004)
 Mission No. X (2005)
 Mastercutor (2007)
 Dominator (2009)
 Rev-Raptor (2011)
 Steelhammer (2013)
 Decadent (2015)
 Steelfactory (2018)
 We Are One (2020) (with Das Musikkorps Der Bundeswehr)
 Game Over (2021)
 My Way (2022)

Live albums 
 Live from Russia (2001)
 Nailed to Metal – The Missing Tracks (2003)
 Mastercutor Alive (2008)
 Live in Sofia (2011)
 Steelhammer - Live from Moscow (2014)
 Live – Back to the Roots (2016) (as Dirkschneider)
 Live – Back to the Roots – Accepted! (Live in Brno) (2017) (as Dirkschneider)

Compilation albums 
 Best Of (1999)
 Metallized (2007)
 Celebrator (2012)

Singles/EPs 
 They Want War (1988)
 Heart of Gold (1990)
 Faceless World (1990)
 Two Faced Woman (1997)
 Independence Day (1997)
 Lovemachine (1998)
 Dancing with an Angel (2002)
 24/7 EP (2005)
 The Wrong Side of Midnight EP (2007)
 Infected EP (2009)
 Leatherhead EP (2011)
 Steelhammer (2013)
 Decadent (2014)
 Arising (2021) (as Dirkschneider & The Old Gang)

Music Videos 
 They Want War (1988)
 Break the Rules (1989)
 Heart of Gold (1990)
 Independence Day (1997)
 Dancing with an Angel (with Doro Pesch) (2002)
 Thunderball (2004)
 Blind Eyes (2004)
 The Arbiter (2004)
 Trainride to Russia (2004)
 Mean Streets (2005)
 The Wrong Side of Midnight (2007)
 Black and White (2009)
 Leatherhead (2011)
 I Give As Good As I Get (2011)
 Metal Machine (2013)
 Heavy Rain (2013)
 Decadent (2014)

DVDs 
 Nailed to Metal – The Complete History (2003)
 Thundervision (2004)
 Mastercutor Alive (2008)
 Live in Sofia (2012)
 Steelhammer – Live from Moscow (2014)
 Navy Metal Night (2015) "Special Show with Orchestra"
 ''Pandemic Survival Show (2020) Plovdiv

References

https://en.wikipedia.org/wiki/Too_Mean_to_Die#:~:text=Too%20Mean%20to%20Die%20is%20the%20sixteenth%20studio,Shouse%2C%20who%20joined%20the%20band%20that%20same%20year.

External links

 Official web site
 Interview with Udo Dirkschneider @ Metalpaths.com (2011)
 HardRadio.com interview with Udo Dirkschneider

1952 births
Living people
20th-century German male singers
German heavy metal singers
Musicians from Wuppertal
Accept (band) members
21st-century German male singers
English-language singers from Germany
U.D.O. members